Rosembrick José Bezerra de Lira (born April 3, 1979), or simply Rosembrick, is a Brazilian attacking midfielder.

Honours
Pernambuco State League: 2005, 2007

External links
 
  
  

1979 births
Living people
Brazilian footballers
Ferroviário Atlético Clube (CE) players
Paysandu Sport Club players
Esporte Clube Vitória players
Santa Cruz Futebol Clube players
Sociedade Esportiva Palmeiras players
Sport Club do Recife players
Central Sport Club players
Brasiliense Futebol Clube players
Criciúma Esporte Clube players
Salgueiro Atlético Clube players
Associação Desportiva São Caetano players
América Futebol Clube (RN) players
Treze Futebol Clube players
Association football midfielders